The 1980 Columbia Lions football team was an American football team that represented Columbia University during the 1980 NCAA Division I-A football season. Columbia finished last in the Ivy League. 

In their first season under head coach Bob Naso, the Lions compiled a 1–9 record and were outscored 275 to 89. Sean Cannon and Rico Josephs were the team captains.  

The Lions' winless (0–7) conference record was the worst in the Ivy League standings. Columbia was outscored 214 to 61 by Ivy opponents. 

Ivy League football teams expanded their schedules to 10 games in 1980, making this the first year since 1955 that the Lions played three games against non-Ivy opponents.

Columbia played its home games at Baker Field in Upper Manhattan, in New York City.

Schedule

References

Columbia
Columbia Lions football seasons
Columbia Lions football